Berezove may refer to:

 Berezove, Marinka Raion, a village in Donetsk Oblast, Ukraine
 Berezove, Starobilsk Raion, a village in Luhansk Oblast, Ukraine

See also
Berezovo (disambiguation)